Gayane Khachaturian (May 9, 1942 – May 1, 2009) was a Georgian-Armenian painter and graphic artist.

Biography

Gayane Khachaturian was born into an Armenian family in Tbilisi, capital of Georgia, and studied art at the Nikoladze Art School. She became seriously involved in the art scene after graduating from the Secondary School of Working Youth in 1960. She met Sergei Parajanov in 1967 at Elene Akhvlediani's house and they maintained a close friendship which lasted until his death. Some of Khachaturian’s works are permanently exhibited at the Yerevan Museum of Modern Art, the National Gallery of Armenia, Sergei Parajanov Museum in Yerevan as well as are in a number of private collections, including those owned by Valerie Khanukaev, Bagrat Nikogosyan, and Artashes Aleksanyan. When she was alive, her tiny studio on Bakinskaya Street had become a tourist attraction. According to Russian art critic Vitaly Patsyukov, "Khachaturian is among those pioneers of new artistic consciousness who draw into their focus all phenomenal aspects of European 'actual view' and the radical sensuousness and natural freedom of plastic gesture."

Khachaturian died on May 1, 2009 and is buried in the Armenian Pantheon of Tbilisi (Khojivank).

Exhibitions

Gayane Khachaturian's first informal solo exhibition was at the Skvoznyachok Café in Yerevan in 1967 by the invitation of Sergei Parajanov. Since then her work began to appear in various shows and exhibitions:
 1970 — National Gallery of Georgia, Tbilisi, Group exhibition
 1971 — House of Painters, Yerevan, Solo exhibition
 1972 — House of Actors, named after A.Khorava in Tbilisi
 1978 — Calouste Gulbenkian Museum in Portugal, Lisbon
 1979 — Calouste Gulbenkian Foundation, Paris — Lyon — Marseille
 1979 — Calouste Gulbenkian Foundation, Beirut
 1987 — "Days of Armenian Culture" in Venice
 1995 — "Contemporary Armenian Art," Paris — Metz — Poitiers — Pontivy, Solo exhibition
 1995 — "The Paths of Armenia," Palace of Youth, Paris
 1996 — National Gallery of Armenia, Yerevan, Group exhibition of Georgian and Armenian artists
 2001 — "I Am Gayane from Tiflis," Nashchokin House Gallery, Moscow
 2009 — "Painting — Film," with Andrei Tarkovsky and Sergei Parajanov, National Center for Contemporary Arts, Moscow
 2009 — Armenian Pavilion, 53rd International Art Exhibition of the Venice Biennale
 2010 — "In Memoriam of Gayane Khachaturian" National Gallery of Armenia, Yerevan

References

External links 
 Armenian Center for Contemporary Experimental Art
 Gayane Khachaturian Foundation (in Russian)
 (Video)

Artists from Tbilisi
Armenian women painters
Armenian painters
Georgian people of Armenian descent
Modern painters
20th-century painters from Georgia (country)
1942 births
2009 deaths
Women painters from Georgia (country)
20th-century women artists
Burials at Armenian Pantheon of Tbilisi
21st-century artists from Georgia (country)
21st-century women artists